Camp Mowglis is a nonprofit residential camp founded in 1903 and is one of the oldest summer camps in the United States. It is located in East Hebron, New Hampshire, on the shores of Newfound Lake, and owned by the nonprofit Holt Elwell Memorial Foundation. Mowglis was created with encouragement from author Rudyard Kipling and incorporates themes from his Jungle Books.  The campgrounds were listed on the National Register of Historic Places in 2019.

The symbol of the camp is a wolf cub. The Mowglis Mountain and its Mowglis Trail in New Hampshire get their name from the camp. Many of the surrounding trails were maintained by the camp's boys.

History 

At the turn of the last century, Elizabeth Ford Holt, a reformer from Cambridge, Massachusetts, became interested in establishing summer camps to encourage character development in children. In 1900, she started a short-lived camp for girls, Redcroft, which historian Barksdale Maynard called "the first girls camp of significance." Three years later, Holt purchased the Barnard Farm on the shores of Newfound Lake and founded the Mowglis School of the Open. Holt contacted Rudyard Kipling while living at Naulakha in nearby Dummerston, Vermont, and received his permission to borrow names and themes from the Jungle Books.

Throughout their life, Rudyard Kipling and his wife Carrie maintained an active interest in Camp Mowglis, which still carries on traditions that Kipling inspired—the camp's historic wooden buildings have names such as Akela, Toomai, Baloo, and Panther. The campers are referred to as "the Pack," from the youngest "Cubs" to the oldest campers living in "Den."

Col. Alcott Farar Elwell, who contributed to the development of many trails in the Mount Carrigan region, was the camp director for more than 50 years.

In 2012, Camp Director Sam Punderson retired, and the foundation hired Nick Robbins as the new director. A graduate of Colorado College, Robbins has been a year-round camp director for the camp since 2013. Robbins is active with the American Camp Association and certified Outdoor Emergency Care Provider with the National Ski Patrol.

Former attendees 

 Frank Mauran (1925-2022), President of the Providence Steamboat Company (1967-1982)
 Daniel Dennett, (b. 1945), philosopher
 David Concannon, deep-sea explorer

See also 

 Chocorua Island Chapel

References

External links 
 
 

Mowglis
Hebron, New Hampshire
National Register of Historic Places in Grafton County, New Hampshire